Gabriel Witcher (born June 11, 1978) is a Grammy award winning American multi-instrumentalist, producer, composer, and arranger, best known as a fiddle player and singer. He is a founding member of the string ensemble Punch Brothers. Witcher and his fellow Punch Brothers won the 2019 Grammy for Best Folk Album and were named Affiliate Scholars of Oberlin Conservatory in 2014.

History
Gabe Witcher began his performing career in 1984, at the age of six, at the Strawberry Music Festival in Yosemite when he was invited on stage by Bill Monroe to perform a duet in front of a workshop crowd.  Later that day Witcher, along with his father, were invited to perform three songs on the main stage in between acts.  This launched the formation of "The Witcher Brothers" which performed throughout the southwest United States for 25 years.

In 1993 Witcher contributed original compositions to the soundtrack of the Dom DeLuise-led cult classic The Skateboard Kid. Many of these pieces he performed with his band, Trashkittens. This includes a music video rendition of the electric guitar–driven "Hard to Find", which ends the film. 

In 1995 Witcher was asked to join the "Laurel Canyon Ramblers", led by veteran bluegrass/country musician, Herb Pedersen, after their original fiddler, three-time National Fiddle Champion Byron Berline, moved from Los Angeles to Oklahoma.  He was with them for four years and appeared on two albums with them.

In 1999, Witcher joined Béla Fleck's "The Bluegrass Sessions: Tales from the Acoustic Planet, Vol. 2" tour (filling in for fiddler Stuart Duncan) with Sam Bush, Jerry Douglas, Bryan Sutton and Mark Schatz.  In 2002 Witcher joined Jerry Douglas' band and was a regular member until the formation of Punch Brothers in 2008.

Witcher spent 2005 working with Kenny Loggins and Jim Messina on the Loggins and Messina "Sittin' In Again" tour where he played Fiddle, Mandolin, Dobro, Percussion and sang.

In 2010, he joined the Dave Rawlings Machine for two weeks of tour dates.  The lineup consisted of Rawlings, Gillian Welch, two members of Old Crow Medicine Show, and Witcher.

He performed with Eve 6 on the Horrorscope tour (2000–2001) performing bass and backing vocals, allowing Max Collins more mobility onstage. He also performed on the track "Anytime" from the 2001 film Out Cold.

Witcher has appeared on film & television scores including as The Good Dinosaur, The Hunger Games: Mockingjay – Part 2, Inside Llewyn Davis, The Hunger Games, Brokeback Mountain, Cars, Toy Story, True Detective, Nashville, Better Call Saul, Sons of Anarchy and many others. He co-produced music with T Bone Burnett for the television shows Nashville and True Detective.

Witcher has 1 Grammy win and 10 Grammy nominations: 6 nominations with Punch Brothers and 4 Grammy nominations as a producer: 2017 Best Bluegrass Album for Noam Pikelny's Universal Favorite, 2017 Best Contemporary Instrumental Album for Julian Lage & Chris Eldridge Mount Royal, 2015 Bluegrass Album of the Year for Noam Pikelny Plays Kenny Baker Plays Bill Monroe, and 2013 Bluegrass Album of the Year for Noam Pikelny's Beat the Devil and Carry a Rail, which also won "Album of the Year" at the IBMA Awards in 2014. He has also appeared on records by Paul Simon, Eric Clapton, Elton John, Beck, Willie Nelson, Neil Diamond, Fiona Apple, Shania Twain...

Witcher has written arrangements for Elton John, Kronos Quartet, Punch Brothers, Rhiannon Giddens, Boston Pops, San Francisco Symphony, l'Orchestre Symphonique de Bretagne, North Carolina Symphony, The Secret Sisters, Nashville, and True Detective.

Witcher composed and arranged music for Red Dead Redemption 2 and was music director and conductor for the live performance of the score at the Red Bull Music Festival in Los Angeles in the Spring of 2019.

Personal life 
On September 15, 2013, Witcher married actress Mary Faber and has 2 sons.

Music Director

Sara Bareilles: Saturday Night Live, Ellen, Good Morning America, The Late Late Show w/ James Corden, The Talk, "Amidst The Chaos" Album Release Tour (2019)

The Music of Red Dead Redemption 2: Red Bull Music Festival Los Angeles (2019)

Kennedy Center presents: American Acoustic w Chris Thile – All Star Jam (2016)

Another Day, Another Time: f/ the music of Inside Llewyn Davis – Los Angeles (2013)

Discography

Punch Brothers

Jerry Douglas

Laurel Canyon Ramblers

Credits

Albums

Film

Television

^ Emmy Nominated

Live Television

Bands/Tours

References

External links
 Gabe Witcher on Myspace
 Punch Brothers Official Website
 Punch Brothers on Myspace
 http://www.allmusic.com/artist/gabe-witcher-mn0000150553/credits
 http://www.grammy.com
 

American fiddlers
American record producers
American bluegrass musicians
American session musicians
1978 births
Living people
Place of birth missing (living people)
21st-century violinists
Punch Brothers members